The University of New England (UNE) is a private research university in Maine with campuses in Portland and Biddeford, as well as a study abroad campus in Tangier, Morocco. During the 2020 academic year, 7,208 students were enrolled in UNE's campus-based and online programs. It traces it historical origins to 1831 when Westbrook Seminary opened on what is now the UNE Portland Campus.

UNE is the largest private university in the state of Maine and the largest educator of healthcare professionals for Maine. It is organized into five colleges that combine to offer more than 70 undergraduate, graduate, online, and professional degrees. Known predominantly for its programs in the sciences and health sciences, UNE also offers degrees in the marine sciences, data science, environmental science, mathematics, business, education, the humanities, and many other subjects. Its College of Osteopathic Medicine is the only medical school in Maine and its College of Dental Medicine is the only dental college in northern New England. It is classified among "R2: Doctoral Universities – High research activity".

History 
In 1939, a boys-only high school and junior college called the College Séraphique was founded in Biddeford by Father Decary and the Franciscan friar of St. Andre's parish.

In 1952, the school changed its name to St. Francis College and began granting bachelor's degrees with state approval in 1953. The high school program was phased out by 1961, and the college was first accredited in 1966.

The school became co-educational for the first time in 1967, and the Franciscans withdrew from the administration of the college in 1974.

To survive dropping enrollment, St. Francis College entered into an agreement with the New England Foundation for Osteopathic Medicine to establish the New England College of Osteopathic Medicine on the same campus, and in 1978 the two became the "University of New England", although the merger would not be fully complete until a 1987 vote by the College of Osteopathic Medicine corporation.  In 1996, Westbrook College merged with the University of New England. The merger took place under the terms of the original 1831 Westbrook charter, and the combined institutions became Westbrook College before changing the name back to the University of New England. The campus of the former Westbrook College is now known as the UNE Portland Campus.

In December 2010, the university received the largest gift in its history—$10 million from the Harold Alfond Foundation to build the Harold Alfond Forum on the Biddeford Campus, and to support interprofessional healthcare workforce education.

The Alfond Forum, which opened fall 2012, includes a  athletics complex featuring an ice hockey rink with 900 seats; a basketball court with 1,200 seats; classroom space; a fitness center; and multi-purpose indoor practice courts that can also be used for performances and other events, with a combined seating capacity of 3,000. This provides the largest gathering space on both the Biddeford and Portland campuses. The complex is located between UNE's new synthetic blue turf field and Sokokis Hall.

In October 2020, the University of New England received a gift of $30 million from the Harold Alfond Foundation as part of a major investment in eight Maine institutions for the purpose of growing the state’s workforce and economy and supporting quality health care. The grant will support the construction of a new facility for the relocation of the University’s College of Osteopathic Medicine from the Biddeford Campus to the Portland Campus, the establishment of a new Institute for Interprofessional Education and Practice, and the acceleration of high-growth undergraduate and graduate programs on the Biddeford Campus to meet student demand and workforce needs, such as aquaculture, entrepreneurship, criminal justice, sports media communication, and others.

James D. Herbert, Ph.D., serves as UNE's sixth president. His tenure began on July 1, 2017, immediately following the 11-year tenure of Danielle N. Ripich.

Campuses 
UNE offers three campuses that provide students with a range of learning environments. The university's two campuses in coastal Maine, USA, house undergraduate, graduate, and professional programs, while its Tangier Campus provides a semester-abroad opportunity in Morocco.

Biddeford Campus
The 26 buildings on the campus include the Harold Alfond Center for Health Sciences, the Pickus Center for Biomedical Research, and the Marine Science Center.

The Harold Alfond Center for Health Sciences houses Maine's only medical school: The University of New England College of Osteopathic Medicine.

UNE's Biddeford Campus is also home to the George and Barbara Bush Center, which houses material chronicling the Bush legacy in Maine, including memorabilia on loan from the George H.W. Bush Presidential Library at Texas A & M University. The Center includes a replica of the Oval Office during Bush's term in the White House and a statue of the former president. Each year, UNE hosts an annual lecture at its Biddeford Campus that is often attended by the former president and his family. In September 2017, former U.S. Senate Majority Leader George Mitchell visited UNE's Biddeford Campus to deliver the Bush Lecture.

The UNE Biddeford Campus also includes the Harold Alfond Forum, which offers 105,000 square-feet (9,800 m2) of athletic and learning space, including: an NHL-size ice hockey rink with 900 seats, a basketball court with 1,200 seats, classrooms, a fitness center, and multi-purpose indoor practice courts that are also used for performances and lectures. A $10 million gift from the Harold Alfond Foundation facilitated the building's construction and the development of associated programming.

UNE also owns Ram Island, off the coast of the Biddeford Campus, which serves as a field station for student and faculty researchers.

Portland Campus

The  Portland Campus is designated a national historic district. It is located in a suburban neighborhood, just a short drive from Portland's downtown.

The UNE Portland Campus houses the university's Westbrook College of Health Professions and the College of Dental Medicine. The College of Dental Medicine, which is housed in the $14.5 million Oral Health Center, graduated its first class in 2017. It is Maine's only dental college.

Other features of the UNE Portland Campus include the Art Gallery, the Maine Women Writers Collection, Alumni Hall, and the Center for Global Humanities. Alumni Hall is the oldest building on campus, dating to an original opening in 1834; its most recent renovation was completed in 2016. The Center for Global Humanities hosts scholars from around the globe for public lectures. Past lectures have featured Noam Chomsky, Sherwin Nuland, and Bill McKibben as speakers.

Tangier Campus
In January 2014, UNE opened a campus in Tangier, Morocco, within the campus of the American School of Tangier. The UNE campus consists of two buildings—one for academic programming and the other for student and staff housing. It also includes an outdoor court colored UNE blue. Undergraduates take courses delivered in English in the sciences, humanities, and languages.
 
While studying in Morocco, UNE students take excursions to Casablanca, Fez, Marrakesh, and a UNE satellite program in Seville, Spain.

The UNE Tangier Campus also hosts the Tangier Global Forum, a public lecture series designed to facilitate discussion of issues facing the global community. On May 12, 2017, former U.S. Senate Majority Leader George J. Mitchell visited the UNE Tangier Campus to present a lecture titled "Is Peace Possible in the Middle East?"

Academics
UNE offers more than 70 undergraduate, graduate, and professional degree programs. The university also has Maine's only medical school and Maine's only dental school.

College of Arts and Sciences
The UNE College of Arts and Sciences offers more than 40 undergraduate and graduate degree programs. Popular majors include biology, business, data science, education, environmental science, marine science, marine entrepreneurship, mathematics, and psychology. The College focuses on experiential learning, close academic advising and career counseling to support graduates in career preparation.

Westbrook College of Health Professions
The UNE Westbrook College of Health Professions prepares students for careers in the healthcare fields. Students participate in clinical simulations, inter-professional learning experiences, service learning, and other experiences that enable them to transition smoothly into the workforce upon graduation. Programs included are Pharmacy, Physician Assistant, Physical Therapy, Social Work, Occupational Therapy, and Nurse Anesthesia. The Westbrook College of Health Professions confers undergraduate degrees including a B.S. in Applied Exercise Science, B.S. in Dental Hygiene, and B.S. in Nursing; as well as graduate and doctorate degrees such as Master of Science in Athletic Training (M.S.A.T.), Master of Science in Occupational Therapy (M.S.O.T.), Master of Science in Physician Assistant (M.S.P.A.), Master of Science in Social Work (M.S.W.), Doctor of Pharmacy (PharmD), and Doctor of Physical Therapy (D.P.T.).

College of Osteopathic Medicine
The University of New England College of Osteopathic Medicine is the only medical school in the state of Maine. Its graduates constitute 25 percent of primary care physicians practicing in rural parts of Maine, and 10 percent of practicing physicians in the state. Founded in 1978, it is accredited by the Commission on Osteopathic College Accreditation (COCA) and the Commission on Institutions of Higher Education of the New England Association of Schools and Colleges.

College of Dental Medicine
The UNE College of Dental Medicine is the only dental school in northern New England. Accredited by the American Dental Association Commission on Dental Accreditation, it offers opportunities for students to treat patients in UNE's Oral Health Center during their first three years and at clinical sites throughout New England in their fourth years.

College of Graduate and Professional Studies: Online Learning
The UNE College of Graduate and Professional Studies is 100% online, offering graduate degrees and certificate programs. In 2015, the college enrolled students from all 50 U.S. states and 27 countries.

Research and Centers of Excellence 
The University of New England is categorized as an R2 University by the Carnegie Classification of Institutions of Higher Education, which indicates that the institution engages in "High Research Activity.” UNE has several centers of excellence for research and scholarship. These university-wide centers build on existing programs in public health, neuroscience, humanities, collaborative education, and other topics.

The centers are designed to provide opportunities for collaborative research and scholarship programs for interdisciplinary, multi-investigator, and multi-institutional awards. The centers are also designed to expand undergraduate research at UNE and explore opportunities for future doctoral programs. The centers include:

Center for Excellence in Collaborative Education 
Center for Excellence in Aging and Health
Center for Excellence in Digital Health
Center for Excellence in the Neurosciences 
Center for Excellence in Public Health
Center of Biomedical Research Excellence for the Study of Pain and Sensory Function
UNE North: The Institute for North Atlantic Studies 
Center for Enrichment of Teaching & Learning
Center for Global Humanities

Rankings 
UNE's programs have received national and international recognition in recent years:
Princeton Review ranks UNE in "The Best 386 Colleges" 2021 edition.
 UNE is ranked #285 in the 2023 U.S. News & World Report Best Colleges Ranking
 Forbes ranks UNE #452 in its list of "America’s Top Colleges for 2019."
 In 2017, The Wall Street Journal/Times Higher Education Ranked UNE 325th among U.S. colleges and universities.
 In 2015, the Brookings Institution ranked UNE second among Maine universities and colleges for its ability to increase students' career earnings.  
The University of New England is accredited by the New England Commission of Higher Education.

Athletics 

University of New England teams participate as members of the National Collegiate Athletic Association's Division III. The Nor'easters are a member of the Commonwealth Coast Conference (CCC) for thirteen of the school's current varsity sports; for women's ice hockey, the Nor'easters belong to the New England Hockey Conference. Men's sports include basketball, cross country, golf, ice hockey, lacrosse, and soccer. Women's sports include basketball, cross country, field hockey, ice hockey, lacrosse, rugby, soccer, softball, swimming, and volleyball. In 2017, UNE fielded a sub-varsity football team in preparation for 2018 when it became a varsity football member of the CCC's football-only arm of Commonwealth Coast Football.

References

External links
Official website

 
Buildings and structures at the University of New England (United States)
Educational institutions established in 1831
Universities and colleges in Portland, Maine
Universities and colleges in York County, Maine
Dental schools in Maine
1939 establishments in Maine
New England Hockey Conference teams
University of New England